Horodyskia is a fossilised organism found in rocks dated from  to . Its shape has been described as a "string of beads" connected by a very fine thread. It is considered one of the oldest known eukaryotes.

Biology 
Comparisons of different fossils in the same locations suggest that it rearranged itself into fewer but larger main masses as the sediment grew deeper round its base. It may also have had a series of holdfasts along the bottom of the thread.  Dimple marks in offshore sandstone have been found in the same deposits as Horodyskia, suggesting that they may be remnants of older holdfasts. Thin sections of Horodyskia have revealed a system of tubes within the beads, including connecting strings, and other tubes radiating outward from each bead. Partial burial and branching of these tubes suggest that it may have had a benthic sessile lifestyle. Members of the genus are distinguished by bead size and spacing, with the beads of H. moniliformis being larger and more spaced than H. williamsii.

Distribution 
Species of Horodyskia has been found in Western Australia, Southern China, and in parts of North America, They are found in siliciclastic rocks such as sandstone, often as casts or molds.

Classification 
Like many Precambrian organisms, the biology of Horodyskia is still poorly understood. As a result, it is difficult to classify what type of organism it may have been. Horodyskia has been considered an early metazoan, and a colonial foraminiferan.  More recently it has been hypothesized that they are a type of Geosiphon-like fungus (Glomeromycota, Archaeosporales), due to the similarity of Horodyskia’s bead-like structures to the bladders of early growth stage Geosiphons.

See also
List of Ediacaran genera
Francevillian biota
Francevillian B Formation

Footnotes

Fossils of China
Precambrian life
Glomeromycota